{{safesubst:#invoke:RfD|||month = March
|day = 10
|year = 2023
|time = 14:33
|timestamp = 20230310143358

|content=
REDIRECT Wahpeton

}}